Shapiro syndrome is an extremely rare disorder consisting of paroxysmal hypothermia (due to hypothalamic dysfunction of thermoregulation), hyperhydrosis (sweating), and agenesis of the corpus callosum with onset typically on adulthood. The disease affects about 50 people worldwide. The duration and frequency of the episodes vary from person to person, with some episodes lasting hours to weeks and occurring from hours to years. Very little is known about the disease due to the small number of people affected.

References

Further reading
 "Shapiro syndrome" Shenoy C. QJM. 2008 Jan;101(1):61-2. 
 "Shapiro syndrome with hypothalamic hypothyroidism" Arkader R, Takeuchi CA. Arq Neuropsiquiatr. 2008 Jun;66(2B):418-9. 
 "Subtotal corpus callosum agenesis with recurrent hyperhidrosis-hypothermia (Shapiro syndrome)" Tambasco N, Corea F, Bocola V. Neurology. 2005 Jul 12;65(1):124.

External links 

Neurological disorders
Rare syndromes